This article contains information about the literary events and publications of 2001.

 – Opening sentence, Ian McEwan, Atonement

Events
February 15 – The author Michael Crichton signs a new deal with HarperCollins Publishers that reportedly earns him $40 million for two books.
April 1 – The BookCrossing scheme for leaving books for strangers to find is launched.
April 13 – The film version of Helen Fielding's 1996 novel Bridget Jones's Diary has uncredited cameo roles as themselves for Salman Rushdie, Julian Barnes and Jeffrey Archer, at a literary party.
July 19 – The English popular novelist and politician Jeffrey Archer, having been found guilty of perjury in a libel trial, is sentenced to imprisonment.
September 19 – Amiri Baraka reads his poem "Somebody Blew Up America?" at a poetry festival in New Jersey, eight days after the September 11 attacks.
December 10 – The live-action film version of J. R. R. Tolkien's The Lord of the Rings: The Fellowship of the Ring, directed by Peter Jackson, opens in London. Its appearance has a strong impact on readership of the trilogy.

New books

Fiction
Niccolò Ammaniti – Io non ho paura
Hiromu Arakawa – Fullmetal Alchemist (鋼の錬金術師, Hagane no Renkinjutsushi, manga series, begins publication)
Raymond Benson – Never Dream of Dying
Dennis Bock – The Ash Garden
Ben Bova – The Precipice
Geraldine Brooks – Year of Wonders
Lois McMaster Bujold – The Curse of Chalion
Javier Cercas – Soldiers of Salamis (Soldados de Salamina)
Joseph Connolly – S.O.S.
Bernard Cornwell
Sharpe's Trafalgar
Gallows Thief
Douglas Coupland – All Families Are Psychotic
Achmat Dangor – Bitter Fruit
Helen Dunmore – The Siege
Umberto Eco – Baudolino
James Ellroy – The Cold Six Thousand
Leif Enger – Peace Like a River
Sebastian Faulks – On Green Dolphin Street
Leon Forrest – Meteor in the Madhouse
Jonathan Franzen – The Corrections
Rodrigo Fresán – Mantra
Diana Gabaldon – The Fiery Cross
Kate Grenville – The Idea of Perfection
John Grisham
A Painted House
Skipping Christmas
Abdulrazak Gurnah – By the Sea
Margaret Peterson Haddix – Among the Impostors
Joanne Harris – Five Quarters of the Orange
Vigdis Hjorth – Om bare (If only)
Nick Hornby – How to Be Good
Silas House – Clay's Quilt
Nancy Huston – Dolce Agonia
John Irving – The Fourth Hand
Fleur Jaeggy – Proleterka
P. D. James – Death in Holy Orders
Greg Keyes
Edge of Victory: Conquest
Edge of Victory: Rebirth
Stephen King
Black House'DreamcatcherChristian Kracht – 1979Hanif Kureishi – Gabriel's GiftJoe R. Lansdale – Captains OutrageousJohn le Carré – The Constant GardenerUrsula K. Le Guin – The Birthday of the World, and Other StoriesPedro Lemebel – Tengo miedo torero (My Tender Matador)
Mario Vargas Llosa – The Feast of the Goat (La fiesta del chivo)David Lodge – Thinks ...James Luceno – Cloak of DeceptionIan McEwan – AtonementAndreï Makine – Music of a Life (La Musique d'une vie)Juliet Marillier – Child of the ProphecyYann Martel – Life of PiAlice Munro – Hateship, Friendship, Courtship, Loveship, Marriage (short stories)
V S Naipaul – Half a LifeR. K. Narayan – Under the Banyan TreeJoyce Carol Oates – Middle Age: A RomanceChuck Palahniuk – ChokeNoni Power – Crawling at NightTerry PratchettThe Amazing Maurice and his Educated RodentsThief of TimeThe Last HeroSven Regener – Herr LehmannKathy Reichs – Fatal VoyageAlain Robbe-Grillet – La RepriseJean-Christophe Rufin – Rouge BrésilSalman Rushdie – FuryRichard Russo – Empire FallsW. G. Sebald – AusterlitzNava Semel – And the Rat Laughed (ואת צחוק של עכברוש)
Michael Slade – Death's DoorOlga Slavnikova – Bessmertniy (The Immortal)
Danielle Steel – Leap of FaithAntonio Tabucchi – It's Getting Later All the TimeAmy Tan – The Bonesetter's DaughterTimothy Taylor – Stanley ParkAnne Tyler – Back When We Were GrownupsJane Urquhart – The Stone CarversAndrew Vachss – Pain ManagementTim Winton – Dirt MusicCarlos Ruiz Zafón – La sombra del viento (The Shadow of the Wind; first in El cementerio de los libros olvidados (The Cemetery of Forgotten Books) series)
Juli Zeh – Eagles and AngelsChildren and young people
David Almond – Secret HeartMalorie Blackman – Noughts and Crosses (first in the Noughts and Crosses series of five books)
Eoin Colfer – Artemis Fowl (first in the eponymous series of eight books)
Eva Ibbotson – Journey to the River SeaDavid Klass – You Don't Know MeHilary McKay – Saffy's AngelPatricia McKissack – Goin' Someplace SpecialMichael MorpurgoMore Muck and MagicOut of the AshesToro! Toro!Lesléa Newman – Cats, Cats, Cats!Linda Sue Park – A Single ShardPhilip Reeve – Mortal Engines (November 16)
J. K. Rowling – Harry Potter and the Goblet of FireLemony SnicketThe Ersatz ElevatorThe Vile VillageThe Hostile HospitalJacqueline Wilson – SleepoversDrama
Richard Alfieri – Six Dance Lessons in Six WeeksGurpreet Kaur Bhatti – Behsharam (Shameless)
Abdelkader Benali – YasserNeil LaBute – The Shape of ThingsLynn Manning – WeightsPeter Morris – The Age of ConsentZlatko Topčić – Time OutPoetry

 Anne Carson – The Beauty of the Husband

Non-fiction
Tom Allen – Rolling HomeJan Bondeson – Buried Alive: The Terrifying History of Our Most Primal FearDionne Brand – A Map to the Door of No Return: Notes to BelongingEdwin Bryant – The Quest for the Origins of Vedic CultureEamon Duffy – The Voices of Morebath. Reformation and Rebellion in an English VillageBarbara Ehrenreich – Nickel and DimedKoenraad Elst – The Saffron SwastikaMem Fox – Reading MagicAntonia Fraser – Marie Antoinette: The JourneyDorothy Gallagher – How I Came Into My Inheritance and Other True StoriesStephen Hawking – The Universe in a NutshellLaura Hillenbrand – Seabiscuit: An American LegendChristopher Hitchens – The Trial of Henry KissingerGary Lachman – Turn Off Your MindLawrence Lessig – The Future of IdeasNormand Lester – Le Livre noir du Canada Anglais (The Black Book of English Canada)Steven Levy – Crypto: How the Code Rebels Beat the Government—Saving Privacy in the Digital AgeMargaret MacMillan – Peacemakers: The Paris Peace Conference of 1919 and Its Attempt to End WarMichael Moore – Stupid White MenMumtaz Mufti – Ali Pur Ka AeeliPavel Polian – Against Their Will... A History and Geography of Forced Migrations in the USSRE. Hoffmann Price – Book of the DeadEric Schlosser – Fast Food NationMiranda Seymour – Mary ShelleyAndrew Solomon – The Noonday Demon: An Atlas of DepressionBen Thompson - Ways of HearingTürkmenbaşy – Ruhnama (The Book of the Soul, first part)
Ivan Vladislavic – The Restless SupermarketFrans de Waal – The Ape and the Sushi MasterBenjamin Woolley – The Queen's Conjuror: The Science and Magic of Dr. DeeDeaths
January 5 – G. E. M. Anscombe, English analytic philosopher (died 2001)
January 8 – Catherine Storr, English children's writer (born 1913)
January 11 – Lorna Sage, English scholar (born 1943)
January 31 – Gordon R. Dickson, Canadian-born American science fiction writer (born 1923)
February 7 – Anne Morrow Lindbergh, American author and aviator (born 1906)
February 14
Alan Ross, Indian-born English poet and editor (born 1922)
Richard Laymon, American horror fiction writer (born 1947)
March 1  – Mahmud Arif, Saudi Arabian poet (born 1909)
March 12 – Robert Ludlum, American novelist (born 1927)
May 11 – Douglas Adams, English writer, humorist and dramatist (born 1952)
May 13 
Jason Miller, American actor and playwright (born 1939)
R. K. Narayan, Indian novelist writing in English (born 1906)
June 1 – Hank Ketcham, American cartoonist (born 1920)
June 27 – Tove Jansson, Finnish children's author writing in Swedish (born 1914)
July 3 – Mordecai Richler, Canadian author, screenwriter and essayist (born 1931)
July 18 – James Hatfield, American author (born 1958)
July 31 – Poul Anderson, American fantasy and sci-fi author (born 1926)
August 6 – Jorge Amado, Brazilian writer (born 1912)
August 20 – Fred Hoyle, English astronomer and science fiction writer (born 1915)
November 10 – Ken Kesey, American author (born 1935)
November 25 – David Gascoyne, English surrealist poet (born 1916)
December 21 – Dick Schaap, American journalist and author (born 1934)
December 14 – W. G. Sebald, German novelist and academic (born 1944)

Awards
Nobel Prize for Literature: V.S. Naipaul

Australia
Miles Franklin Award: Frank Moorhouse, Dark PalaceCanada
Giller Prize for Canadian Fiction: Richard B. Wright – Clara CallanSee 2001 Governor General's Awards for a complete list of winners and finalists for those awards.
Edna Staebler Award for Creative Non-Fiction: Taras Grescoe – Sacré BluesFrance
Prix Décembre: Chloé Delaume, Prix Femina: Marie Ndiaye, Prix Goncourt: Jean-Christophe Rufin, Prix Médicis French: Edwy Plenel, Prix Médicis Non-Fiction: Prix Médicis International: Antonio Skarmeta, United Kingdom
Booker Prize: Peter Carey, True History of the Kelly GangCarnegie Medal for children's literature: Terry Pratchett, The Amazing Maurice and his Educated RodentsJames Tait Black Memorial Prize for fiction: Sid Smith, Something Like a HouseJames Tait Black Memorial Prize for biography: Robert Skidelsky, John Maynard Keynes: Volume 3 – Fighting for Britain 1937–1946 Caine Prize for African Writing: Helon Habila, "Love Poems"
Cholmondeley Award: Ian Duhig, Paul Durcan, Kathleen Jamie, Grace Nichols
Eric Gregory Award: Leontia Flynn, Thomas Warner, Tishani Doshi, Patrick Mackie, Kathryn Gray, Sally Read
Griffin Poetry Prize: Anne Carson, Men in the Off Hours and Nikolai Popov and Heather McHugh, translation of Glottal Stop: 101 Poems by Paul Celan
Hugo Award: J. K. Rowling, Harry Potter and the Goblet of FireSamuel Johnson Prize: Michael Burleigh, The Third ReichQueen's Gold Medal for Poetry: Michael Longley
Orange Prize for Fiction: Kate Grenville, The Idea of PerfectionWhitbread Best Book Award: Patrick Neate, Twelve Bar BluesUnited States
Agnes Lynch Starrett Poetry Prize awarded to Gabriel Gudding for A Defense of PoetryAiken Taylor Award for Modern American Poetry, Frederick Morgan
Bernard F. Connors Prize for Poetry, Gabrielle Calvocoressi, “Circus Fire, 1944”
Bollingen Prize for Poetry, Louise Glück
Brittingham Prize in Poetry, Robin Behn, Horizon NoteCompton Crook Award: Syne Mitchell, Murphy's GambitFrost Medal: Sonia Sanchez
Hugo Award: J.K. Rowling, Harry Potter and the Goblet of FireNewbery Medal for children's literature: Richard Peck, A Year Down YonderNational Book Award for Fiction: to The Corrections by Jonathan Franzen
National Book Critics Circle Award: to Austerlitz by W.G. Sebald
PEN/Faulkner Award for Fiction: to Philip Roth for The Human Stain
Pulitzer Prize for Drama: David Auburn, ProofPulitzer Prize for Fiction: Michael Chabon, The Amazing Adventures of Kavalier & ClayPulitzer Prize for Poetry: Stephen Dunn, Different HoursWallace Stevens Award: John Ashbery
Whiting Awards:
Fiction: Emily Carter, Matthew Klam, Akhil Sharma, Samrat Upadhyay, John Wray
Nonfiction: Judy Blunt, Kathleen Finneran
Plays: Brighde Mullins
Poetry: Joel Brouwer, Jason Sommer

Other
Camões Prize: Eugénio de Andrade
Europe Theatre Prize: Lev Dodin, Michel Piccoli
Finlandia Prize: Hannu Raittila, Canal GrandeInternational Dublin Literary Award: Alistair MacLeod, No Great MischiefPremio Nadal: Fernando Marías, El Niño de los CoronelesPremio Strega: Domenico Starnone, Via GemitoPremio de Novela Ciudad de Torrevieja (first award): Javier Reverte, La Noche DetenidaPremio Antón Losada Diéguez (category Creación literaria): Xurxo Borrazás, Na maletaSAARC Literary Award: Ganesh Narayandas Devy, Shamsur Rahman
Viareggio Prize: Niccolò Ammaniti, Io non ho paura, Michele Ranchetti, Verbale, and Giorgio Pestelli, Canti del destino''

References

 
Literature
Years of the 21st century in literature

cy:Llenyddiaeth yn 2000